David Brendan Mustard (born September 18, 1968, in Buffalo, New York) is an American economist and the Josiah Meigs Distinguished Teaching Professor of economics at the University of Georgia's Terry College of Business.

Research
In 1997, when he was a graduate student at the University of Chicago, Mustard co-authored an influential study with John Lott, examining the effects of right-to-carry laws, which make it easier to obtain a concealed handgun license. The study concluded that these laws reduce violent crime rates, without increasing accidental firearm deaths. This study has been criticized by other researchers, including Ian Ayres and John J. Donohue.

With Earl Grinols, Mustard has also researched the economic effects of gambling on crime, jobs, and tax revenues.

References

External links
Faculty page

Economists from New York (state)
1968 births
Living people
Scientists from Buffalo, New York
University of Georgia faculty
University of Rochester alumni
Alumni of the University of Edinburgh
University of Chicago alumni
Microeconomists
21st-century American economists